Georgia participated in the Junior Eurovision Song Contest 2020, which was held in Warsaw, Poland on 29 November 2020. Sandra Gadelia was selected through the televised show Ranina. She achieved 6th place with 111 points.

Background

In the 2019 contest, Giorgi Rostiashvili carried the Georgian flag to Gliwice Arena's stage with We Need Love following his victory in the second season of Ranina, achieving just the 14th place out of 19 with 69 points.

Before Junior Eurovision

Ranina
For the third year in a row, Georgia will use an original children's talent show format, Ranina (Georgian: რანინა), as the selection method for their artist. The third season was originally planned to be around two months long starting in late March. However, the COVID-19 pandemic caused the show to be suspended indefinitely. On 13 July 2020, public broadcaster GPB released a new advertising spot for Ranina confirming its return, with recordings due to commence in the following weeks and a revamped format to adjust to the shorter time available. On 18 August 2020, GPB released footage of the first five rehearsals on Facebook and announced that the first show would be premiered on 4 September 2020 at 22:00 Georgian time — though all references to that were deleted a day later. Classical pianist David Aladashvili will continue as the main host of the show, this time joined by Lika Evgenidze as co-host. A new advertisement was released three days later, on 21 August 2020, postponing the season premiere for a week to 11 September 2020.

Contestants

Shows

Round 1 (11–18 September 2020) 

The jurors for this round were Elene Kalandadze, Davit Evgenidze and Giorgi Asanishvili.

Round 2 (25 September – 2 October 2020) 

The jurors for this round were Tornike Kipiani, Davit Evgenidze and Tika Balanchine.

Round 3 (9 – 16 October 2020) 

The jurors for this round were Archil Ushveridze, Giorgi Mikadze and Maia Mikaberidze.

Round 4 (23 – 30 October 2020) 

The jurors for this round were Rusudan Bolkvadze, Eka Mamaladze and Bibi Kvachadze.

At the end of Show 8, the semi-finalists were announced. The five participants who collected the most points throughout the four tours advanced to the next round. They are Marita Khvedelidze, Nia Khinchikashvili, Rati Gelovani, Sandra Gadelia, and Shio Kavsadze.

Semi-final (6 November 2020)

Final (13 November 2020) 
The jurors for the Final were Lana Kutateladze, Davit Evgenidze, and Beka Gochiashvili.

Artist and song information

Sandra Gadelia
Sandra Gadelia (born 2 July 2010) is a Georgian child singer. She represented Georgia at the Junior Eurovision Song Contest 2020 and announced the Georgian jury points at the final of the Junior Eurovision Song Contest 2021 in Paris, France.

You Are Not Alone
"You Are Not Alone" is a song performed by Georgian child singer Sandra Gadelia, which represented Georgia in the Junior Eurovision Song Contest 2020.

At Junior Eurovision
After the opening ceremony, which took place on 23 November 2020, it was announced that Georgia would perform in seventh position in the final, following Poland and preceding Malta.

Voting

During the live show, Georgia received 42 points from online voting, out of 697 total.

Detailed voting results
Every participating country had a national jury that consisted of three music industry professionals and two kids aged between 10 and 15 who were citizens of the country they represented. The rankings of those jurors were combined to make an overall top ten. The results of the Georgian jury were announced during the live show by Marita Khvedelidze, the runner-up of Ranina 2020.

Notes

References

Junior Eurovision Song Contest
Georgia
2020